Events from the year 1912 in Sweden.

Incumbents
 Monarch – Gustaf V
 Prime Minister - Karl Staaff

Events

 3 January – Svenska Scoutförbundet
 5 May–22 July –The Olympic Games take place in Stockholm.
 The Stockholm Olympic Stadium is inaugurated, built to host the Olympics.

Births

 6 January – Johnny Bode, composer  (died 1983)

Deaths

 14 May - August Strindberg, writer  (born 1849) 
 Lotten von Kræmer, writer and philanthropist  (born 1828)

References

 
Years of the 20th century in Sweden
Sweden